Bultman is a surname. Notable people with the surname include: 

 Art Bultman (Arthur Frank Bultman; 1907–1967) was an American football player
 Fritz Bultman (1919–1985), American painter, sculptor, and collagist
 Glenn E. Bultman (born 1940), American politician 
 Jan Bultman (born 1942), Dutch water polo player
 Marion Bultman (born 1960), Dutch sailor
 James Bultman, American football coach

See also
 Rudolf Bultmann (1884–1976), German Lutheran theologian and academic